Shidi is a small town in Yongshun County, in the north west Hunan province of China

References

Divisions of Yongshun County
Towns of Xiangxi Tujia and Miao Autonomous Prefecture